Alaska United Fiber Optic Cable System (abbreviated AUFS or AU) is a submarine fiber optic cable owned by GCI that links Anchorage, several places in Southeast Alaska including Juneau, to Oregon and Washington State. Alaska United East (AU-East) is 3,751 kilometers long with landing points at Anchorage and Lena Point in Juneau, and at the shore of Puget Sound at Norma Beach near Picnic Point in Lynnwood, Washington; AU-West has landings at Seward and on the Pacific coast at Warrenton, Oregon. Both are OC-192 rated (10 G bit/s) as of 2018. Additional overland segments (AU-North/NW) connect Anchorage to Fairbanks and Prudhoe Bay along the Alaska Pipeline corridor and Parks Highway.

Laying cable for the first segment, AU-East from Anchorage to Lynnwood, was accomplished in the second half of 1999. AU-East's initial cost was $120 million and it was one of two 1999 projects bringing high-speed communications including Internet access to Alaska, supplanting the 45 Mbit/s North Pacific Cable (NPC) Alaska Spur. NPC was shut down in 2004.

Alaska Communications depends on fiber connectivity to provide service.

A January 2013 earthquake broke the cable near Wrangell. The cable ship Wave Venture was sent to locate the cable with an ROV and effect repairs.

References

External links

Submarine communications cables in the Pacific Ocean
Communications in Alaska
Communications in Washington (state)
Communications in Oregon
1999 establishments in Alaska
1999 establishments in Washington (state)